A dot planimeter is a device used in planimetrics for estimating the area of a shape, consisting of a transparent sheet containing a square grid of dots. To estimate the area of a shape, the sheet is overlaid on the shape and the dots within the shape are counted. The estimate of area is the number of dots counted multiplied by the area of a single grid square. In some variations, dots that land on or near the boundary of the shape are counted as half of a unit. The dots may also be grouped into larger square groups by lines drawn onto the transparency, allowing groups that are entirely within the shape to be added to the count rather than requiring their dots to be counted one by one.

The estimation of area by means of a dot grid has also been called the dot grid method or (particularly when the alignment of the grid with the shape is random) systematic sampling. Perhaps because of its simplicity, it has been repeatedly reinvented.

Application
In forestry, cartography, and geography, the dot planimeter has been applied to maps to estimate the area of parcels of land. In botany and horticulture, it has been applied directly to sampled leaves to estimate the average leaf area.

In medicine, it has been applied to Lashley diagrams as an estimate of the size of brain lesions.

In mineralogy, a similar technique of counting dots in a grid is applied to cross-sections of rock samples for a different purpose, estimating the relative proportions of different constituent minerals.

Theory
Greater accuracy can be achieved by using a dot planimeter with a finer grid of dots. Alternatively, repeatedly placing a dot planimeter with different irrational offsets from its previous placement, and averaging the resulting measurements, can lead to a set of sampled measurements whose average tends towards the true area of the measured shape. The method using a finer grid tends to have better statistical efficiency than repeated measurement with random placements.

According to Pick's theorem, published by Georg Alexander Pick in 1899, the version of the dot planimeter with boundary dots counting as 1/2 (and with an added correction term of −1) gives exact results for polygons that have the dots as their vertices. According to Blichfeldt's theorem, published by Hans Frederick Blichfeldt in 1914, it is always possible to shift a dot planimeter relative to a given shape without rotating it so that the number of dots within the shape is at least equal to its area.

The Gauss circle problem concerns the error that would be obtained by using a dot planimeter to estimate the area of a circle. As its name suggests, it was studied in the early 19th century by Carl Friedrich Gauss. The maximum error is known to be bounded by a fractional power of the radius of the circle, with exponent between 1/2 and 131/208.

Related devices
The dot planimeter differs from other types of planimeter, which measure the area of a shape by passing a device around its boundary.

The Steinhaus longimeter is a similar transparency-based device for estimating the length of curves by counting crossings.

References

External links
Dot planimeter, Chris Staecker, Fairfield University

Area
Dimensional instruments
Lattice points
Mathematical tools
Measuring instruments